Eminent Domain may refer to:

 Eminent domain, the power of a state to take private property for public use
Eminent domain in the United States
 Eminent Domain (film), 1990
 "Eminent Domain" (Hell on Wheels), a 2013 episode of the TV drama
 "Eminent Domain" (The Killing), a 2013 episode of the TV drama
 Pax Imperia: Eminent Domain, a video game